The Raven Award is an award given annually by the Mystery Writers of America as part of the Edgar Awards. The recipient can be a writer, editor, reviewer, or librarian or possibly a professional in the field: medical examiners and forensic specialists have been honored in addition to reporters and journalists. More broadly, a publishing company, library, book store, museum, historic site, magazine, television show, play, theater group, society, association, festival, or convention may get selected; though, whoever they are, they must demonstrate "outstanding achievement in the mystery field outside of the realm of creative writing."

The first one was presented in 1953. It's not always bestowed every year like the Best Novel or Best Short Story category. Some years feature multiple conferees, while others have none. Though, there was a winner since 1995 up to and including 2022.

Winners

References 

Raven
Raven
English-language literary awards